High Feather is a 10-episode educational television show which ran on PBS in the 1980s; each episode was 30 minutes long. The program's name came from the Old English expression "High Fettle", meaning enjoying life and cheerfully doing the tasks of living. The heartfelt spirit of the show was captured in the lyrics to its theme song: "I'm in High Feather. Feel like the sun is shining on me. High Feather. I'm as free as I can be..."

The series, produced by the New York State Education Department in 1980, followed eight teenagers (four boys and four girls) at the High Feather Summer Camp, where they learn values of honesty, sportsmanship, nutrition, physical fitness, and getting along with others.  The series was filmed at Camp Madison-Felicia and Camp Minisink.

Episodes included "Ballerina", where Leslie, an anorexic, starves herself to the point of exhaustion to achieve a dancer's body, and "Deep Water Test", where Tom was afraid to go shirtless in the lake because of his obesity.

Cast
The cast was an ethnically and racially diverse group of teens:

 Jacqueline Allen (Leslie Reynolds)
 Brian Goldberg (Stan Lipton)
 Virgil Hayes (Leo Bartlett)
 Richard Levey (Tom Page)
 Cindy O'Neal (Suzanne Freestone)
 Emily Wagner (Cathy Ehlers)
 Tasha Washington (Ann Campbell)
 Tino Zaldivar (Domingo Ramos)
 Robert Y R Chung (Kim -the Counselor)
 Brendan Cavanagh (Baby Joey)

Most of the show's young cast were not professional actors.  Emily Wagner, who played Cathy, went on to appear as the character Doris Pickman on the long-running NBC medical series ER.

Adults
 Barbara Brown (Mrs. Riggs)
 Ramona Brito (Nurse)
 Powell McGill (Swim Coach)

Episode titles
"Deep Water Test"
"Stan's Secret"
"Swifty"
"A Nose for News"
"Ballerina"
"Lost in the Woods"
"Going Home"
"The County Fair"
"Saved from the Pound"
"Food Follies"

See also
 Vegetable Soup (TV series)

External links

High Feather at Rick's TVOntario

Health education television series
PBS original programming
1980 American television series debuts
1980 American television series endings
Education in New York (state)
1980s American children's television series
American children's education television series
Television series about teenagers